Oxycinchophen is an antirheumatic agent.

References 

Antirheumatic products
Quinolinols
Alpha hydroxy acids